Visa requirements for Maldivian citizens are administrative entry restrictions by the authorities of other states placed on citizens

of the Maldives.  Maldivian citizens had visa-free or visa on arrival access to 88 countries and territories, ranking the Maldivian passport 58th in terms of travel freedom according to the Henley Passport Index.

Visa requirements map

Visa requirements

Substitute
Maldivian Passport holders are sometimes exempted from applying for a visa to certain countries that they would otherwise be required to apply for, provided they hold a specific visa for a specific country.

 and  signed agreement on mutual abolishing of visas, and that agreement is yet to be ratified.

Non-visa restrictions

See also

 Visa policy of Maldives
 Maldivian passport

References and Notes
References

Notes

Maldives
Foreign relations of the Maldives